Super Bit Mapping (SBM) is a noise shaping process, developed by Sony for CD mastering.

Sony claims that the Super Bit Mapping process converts a 20-bit signal from master recording into a 16-bit signal nearly without sound quality loss, using noise shaping to improve signal-to-noise ratio over the frequency bands most acutely perceived by human hearing.

Audible quantization error is reduced by noise shaping the error according to an equal-loudness contour.

This processing takes place in dedicated hardware inside the recording device. A similar process is used in Sony's DSD to PCM conversion and is called SBM Direct.

See also
 Extended Resolution Compact Disc (XRCD)
 High Definition Compatible Digital (HDCD)

References

Sound technology
Digital signal processing